is a passenger railway station in located in the city of  Moriguchi, Osaka Prefecture, Japan, operated by the private railway company Keihan Electric Railway.

Lines
Moriguchi Station is served by the  Keihan Main Line, and is located 8.3 km from the starting point of the line at Yodoyabashi Station.

Station layout
The station has two elevated island platforms,  serving 4 tracks on the 3rd level with the station building underneath.The ticket gates are located on the 2nd level in the west and the east.

Platforms

Adjacent stations

History
It was renamed on June 20, 1971.

Passenger statistics
In fiscal 2019, the station was used by an average of 36,161 passengers daily.

Surrounding area
 Keihan Department Store Moriguchi
 Sanyo Electric Co., Ltd.
 Moriguchi City Hall
 The Kansai Electric Power Company, Inc. Moriguchi Substation
 Keihan Railway Moriguchi Substation
 Moriguchi Station - Tanimachi Line
 Keihan Bus Station (6 stops)

See also
List of railway stations in Japan

References

External links

Official home page 

Railway stations in Japan opened in 1910
Railway stations in Osaka Prefecture
Moriguchi, Osaka